TODAY is a Singapore English-language digital news provider under Mediacorp, Singapore's largest media broadcaster and provider and the only terrestrial television broadcaster in the country. It was formerly a national free daily newspaper.

At its inception, Mediacorp had a 60% stake in TODAY while, Singapore Press Holdings owned 40% of TODAY. The newspaper was published and distributed from Monday to Saturday.

In 2017, the two media companies announced that SPH will divest its stakes in Mediacorp Press, which publishes TODAY, and Mediacorp TV, which owns Channels 5, 8, U, and Mediacorp Studio.

TODAY was distributed to selected homes upon subscription and for free at MRT stations, bus interchanges, selected food and beverage outlets, shopping malls among other public areas during the morning rush hour.

It had a circulation of 300,000, with more than half of its readers being professionals, managers, executives and business people. It is the second-most-read English-language newspaper in Singapore, after The Straits Times.

Readership is 730,000 according to the Nielsen Media Index Report 2012.

History 
On 10 November 2000, TODAY was launched as a rival to Streats, another English-language freesheet published by the Singapore Press Holdings (SPH). Initially, the newspaper was available only on weekdays.

In 2002, TODAY launched a weekend version, WeekendTODAY, which was also distributed to homes as a free newspaper but also available for sale at newsstands for 50 cents.

In 2004, during a merger deal between MediaCorp and Singapore Press Holdings (SPH) to merge mass-market television and free newspaper operations, SPH's free newspaper Streats was merged into TODAY and continued to be operated under MediaCorp.

In 2010, TODAY launched the TODAY-New York Times International Weekly, covering international affairs, social trends, arts and culture as well as business and finance.

In May 2011, TODAY extended their publication to include a Sunday edition. However in June 2012, the Sunday edition ceased publication.

In 2013, the newspaper had a digital revamp of its website, mobile and tablet applications. It also ceased its afternoon edition.

In April 2017, the weekend edition of the newspaper ceased publication and converted into a digital version. In September, TODAY ceased all its print editions and become a fully online digital newspaper.

Suspension of mrbrown column
On 6 July 2006, the newspaper suspended a weekly opinion column by Lee Kin Mun (alias: mr brown) after the government criticised an article he wrote in his column discussing the rising cost of living in Singapore, which he depicted in satirical style.

Editors

See also

Media in Singapore
List of free daily newspapers
List of newspapers in Singapore
Censorship in Singapore
The Straits Times

References

External links
TODAYonline, Official Website
mediacorp.sg/en/corporate/print, MediaCorp Print Overview
SPH press release: "MediaCorp And Singapore Press Holdings Merge Their TV And Free Newspaper Operations"

2000 establishments in Singapore
English-language newspapers published in Asia
Free daily newspapers
Mediacorp
Newspapers published in Singapore
Newspapers established in 2000